Pirwal is a village in the Punjab province of Pakistan. It is located at 33°6'0N 72°36'11E with an altitude of 386 metres (1,269 feet).

References

Villages in Punjab, Pakistan